Francis Xavier "Big Jeff" Pfeffer (March 31, 1882 – December 19, 1954) was a Major League pitcher from 1905 to 1911. He threw a no-hitter in 1907. He was the older brother of Jeff Pfeffer.

Pfeffer attended the University of Illinois. He made his MLB debut on April 15, 1905 for the Chicago Cubs and had a 4-4 record for them that season. He missed out on the 1906 World Series, going to Boston, where he had his most active season with a record of 13-22 for the 1906 season. He finished second in the National League that season in complete games and strikeouts.

Early the following season, Pfeffer pitched a no-hitter on May 8, 1907,  with the Boston Doves defeating Cincinnati 6-0.

See also
List of Major League Baseball no-hitters

External links

Sportspeople from Champaign, Illinois
1882 births
1954 deaths
Chicago Cubs players
Boston Beaneaters players
Boston Doves players
Boston Rustlers players
Major League Baseball pitchers
Baseball players from Illinois
Baltimore Orioles (IL) players
Toronto Maple Leafs (International League) players
Washington Senators (1912) players